Sandra Nashaat Bassal (born February 2, 1970) is an Egyptian film director.

Biography 
Nashaat is a Coptic Catholic. She was born to a Lebanese mother and a Syrian father. Nashaat attended Cairo's Higher Film Institute alongside Cairo University where she studied French Literature. She has made several long feature films in recent years, all of which were box office successes.

Filmography 

 Akhir Shita (Last Winter. Short film released in 1992)
Al-Mufiola (The Editing Table. Short film released in 1994)
Mabruk wa Bulbul (Mabruk and Bulbul. Released in 1998)
 Leh Khaletny Ahebak (Why did you make me love you? Released in 2000) starring Karim Abdel aziz, Mona Zaki, Hala Shiha and Ahmed Helmi
Haramia Fe KG 2 (Thieves in Kindergarten. Released in 2001) starring Karim Abdel aziz, Hanan Turk, Maged Elkeduani and Talaat Zakaria
Haramia Fe Thailand (Thieves in Thailand. Released in 2003) starring Karim Abdelaziz, Hanan Turk, Maged Elkeduani, Talaat Zakaria and Lotfi Labib
 Mallaki Iskandariya (Alexandria Private. Released in 2005) starring Ahmed Ezz, Nour, Ghada Adel, Khaled Salah, Mohamed Ragab and Reham Abdelghafour.
El Rahena (The Hostage. Released in 2007), starring Ahmed Ezz, Noor, Yasmin Abdelaziz, Salah Abdalah and Mohamed Sharaf
Masgoon Tranzeet (Released in 2008)
El-Maslaha (Released in 2012)
Sharak (Released in 2014)
Bahlam (Released in 2014)

References

External links

 

1970 births
Living people
Egyptian women film directors
Coptic Christians from Egypt